Vajira may refer to:

Vajira (Buddhist nun), mentioned in the Samyutta Nikaya
Vajira Hospital, in Bangkok, Thailand
Princess Vajira, Empress of the Magadha Empire c. 492 – c. 460
Sister Vajirā, a Buddhist ten precept-holder nun in Sri Lanka

See also

Sinhalese feminine given names